The Palm Treo 680 is a combination hybrid PDA/cellphone, or smartphone as the successor to the company's Treo 650.

It was the first-ever Palm OS Treo with no external antenna.

The Treo 680 is older, larger, and heavier than the Palm Centro. But the Treo 680 has a larger keyboard which is more comfortable to type on. There are other differences between the Treo 680 and the Centro. An article on the Treonauts weblog includes a good comparison chart and some in-depth commentary.

Specifications 
 Mobile phone, Broadcom BCM2133 M-Stream chipset providing GSM/GPRS/EDGE Class 10 model with 850/900/1800/1900 MHz bands.
 Built-In Bluetooth 1.2 Compliance - Broadcom BCM2045 "Blutonium" Bluetooth Chipset
 XScale PXA270 (Bulverde) 312 MHz processor
 64 MB onboard NAND storage as user-available stored non-volatile memory
 64 MB onboard NOR StrataFlash (part of the PXA CPU)
 32 MB onboard SDRAM split between system memory, dynamic memory and cache
 1200 mAh removable rechargeable lithium-ion battery
 Palm OS Garnet version 5.4.9
 111.8 mm H x 58.4 mm W x 20.3 mm D (4.4 inches H x 2.3 inches W x 0.8 inches D)
 158 grams (5.5 oz.)
 16-bit Color LCD 320 x 320 TFT touch-screen display
 IrDA transceiver
 Supports SD, SD I/O, SDHC and MultiMediaCards - 4 GB to 32 GB cards supported through SDHC
 Dial-Up Networking (via USB cable or Bluetooth)
 0.3-megapixel (640x480) VGA digital camera with 2x digital zoom and video camera capability
 Palm Desktop version 4.1.4 for Windows and version 4.2 for Mac OS
 Documents To Go version 8 included in ROM
 Stylus

Carriers 
AT&T and Rogers were the only carriers to offer the Treo 680 in North America; but, for a more expensive price, you can get an unlocked GSM Treo that works with any GSM/GPRS/EDGE network worldwide.
The Treo 680 was also available from many carriers worldwide including Singtel, Vodafone in NZ & Aus, Globe, Orange France, Swisscom, Telcel MX, Cable & Wireless (Caribbean) and Claro in Brazil.

Colors 
The Treo 680 comes in several colours: Arctic, Copper, Crimson, and Graphite. Initially, Graphite was the only colour available to wireless carriers, with the Arctic, Copper and Crimson models available unlocked exclusively through Palm.com and Palm's retail stores. This policy was reversed in the US, with Graphite the only color available unlocked and AT&T along with Rogers selling the colored models.  In other countries, unlocked color models were available.

See also 
 Palm Treo smartphones

References

External links 
 Treo 680 Review. PalmInfocenter.
 Hands on With the Treo 680. Engadget.
 Treo 680 troubleshooting and repair advice. iFixit.

Palm mobile phones
Palm OS devices
Smartphones
Mobile phones introduced in 2006